Mona Christine Holm is a Norwegian hammer thrower. In 2007, she competed in the women's hammer throw at the 2007 World Championships in Athletics in Osaka, Japan.

References

External links 
 

Living people
Year of birth missing (living people)
Place of birth missing (living people)
Norwegian female hammer throwers
World Athletics Championships athletes for Norway